Salpingogaster punctifrons is a species of syrphid fly in the family Syrphidae. This is an elusive red, black, and yellow species found in South and Central Florida. Like many hoverflies, this species imitates wasps, this one being particularly similar to mud daubers. Their anatomy is distinctive from many other hoverflies and similar to that of mud daubers in that its first abdominal tergite is elongated.

References

Syrphini
Articles created by Qbugbot
Insects described in 1929